Alaqeh (also Romanized as ‘Alāqeh) is a village in Bala Rokh Rural District, Jolgeh Rokh District, Torbat-e Heydarieh County, Razavi Khorasan Province, Iran. At the 2006 census, its population was 608, in 179 families.

References 

Populated places in Torbat-e Heydarieh County